Jack C. Curtis (July 26, 1923 – May 24, 2009) was a B-24 navigator during World War II who spent over eight months as a prisoner of war. His exploits were chronicled, along with those of his friend and fellow POW, Lawrence Jenkins, in the 2007 book, Eagles' Wings, An Uncommon Story of World War II, by Andrew Layton.

Biography
A lifelong resident of Battle Creek, Jack Curtis was born on 
July 26, 1923. He left his night-time job at Kellogg's to enlist 
in the Army Air Corps when World War II broke out. 
Assigned to Aviation Cadet school, Curtis would become a 
Navigator on B-24 "Liberators" with the 376th Bomb Group, 
stationed in Southern Italy.

By late 1944, Jack had become a seasoned combat veteran 
with more than 30 successful bombing missions to his credit.
However, it was the 31st that would prove to be his most 
memorable. While flying over Marburg, Yugoslavia, his 
aircraft took a mortal hit that killed seven of its eleven 
crewmembers. Jack escaped, but not without great injury. 
His left femur was shattered by shrapnel, and the 
harrowing parachute jump only served to compound his wounds.

After being captured by a German infantry detachment, Curtis would spend eight months 
in various Austrian prison facilities. He was finally liberated and sent back to the United 
States where he would receive medical care at Percy Jones Army Hospital in his hometown 
of Battle Creek. Among the close friends he made as a patient there were future US Senators 
Bob Dole and Daniel Inouye.

Following the war, Curtis graduated from 
Albion College and returned to his job at Kellogg's.
he eventually retired as an executive of industrial 
relations after some 43 years of service. Mr. Curtis was
also involved with many volunteer and service
organizations including the Southwest Michigan 
Food Bank, of which he is a founder.

Captain Curtis's military awards and decorations 
include the Purple Heart, the Air Medal (with 6 
Oak Leaf Clusters), the POW Medal, the American Campaign Medal, the ETO Campaign 
Medal (with 7 Battle Stars), the World War II Victory Medal and the British POW Medal.

References
 Layton, Andrew. "Eagles' Wings: An Uncommon Story of World War II". Xulon Press, 2007.
 American Ex-POW Biography: 

1923 births
2009 deaths
United States Army Air Forces pilots of World War II
People from Battle Creek, Michigan
Recipients of the Air Medal
People from Charlotte, Michigan
Military personnel from Michigan